Chile at the 1936 Summer Olympics in Berlin, Germany was the nation's seventh appearance out of ten editions of the Summer Olympic Games. This was the first time that the nation was represented by a team under the auspices of the Chilean Olympic Committee of 39 males and 1 female athletes that competed in 27 events in 8 sports. The previous six teams that represented the nation were either walk-ons to the competitions or under the auspices of the Chilean Athletics Federation (FEDACHI) founded in 1914.

Athletics

Men
Track events

Road events

Field events

Combined events – Decathlon

Women
Track events

Basketball

Boxing

Cycling

Four cyclists, all men, represented Chile in 1936.

Individual road race
 Jesús Chousal
 Jorge Guerra
 Rafael Montero
 Manuel Riquelme

Team road race
 Jesús Chousal
 Jorge Guerra
 Rafael Montero
 Manuel Riquelme

Sprint
 Manuel Riquelme

Fencing

Seven fencers, all men, represented Chile in 1936.

Men's foil
 Tomás Goyoaga
 César Barros
 Hermogenes Valdebenito

Men's épée
 Tomas Barraza
 Ricardo Romero

Men's team épée
 Ricardo Romero, César Barros, Tomas Barraza, Julio Moreno, Tomás Goyoaga

Men's sabre
 Julio Moreno
 Efrain Díaz
 Tomás Goyoaga

Men's team sabre
 Efrain Díaz, Tomas Barraza, Ricardo Romero, Julio Moreno, Tomás Goyoaga

Sailing

Shooting

Three shooters represented Chile in 1936.

50 m pistol
 Roberto Müller
 Carlos Lalanne
 Enrique Ojeda

Swimming

References

External links
Official Olympic Reports

Nations at the 1936 Summer Olympics
1936
1936 in Chilean sport